The Muslim conquests, Muslim invasions, Islamic conquests, Arab conquest, or Arab Islamic conquest, may refer to:
Early Muslim conquests
Muslim conquests in the Indian subcontinent
Umayyad conquest of Sindh
Muslim conquest of Persia
Muslim conquest of Khorasan
Muslim conquest of Pars
Muslim conquest of Khuzestan
Muslim conquest of Sistan
Muslim conquest of Armenia
Muslim conquests of Afghanistan
Muslim conquest of Transoxiana
Muslim conquest of Azerbaijan
Muslim conquest of the Levant
Muslim conquest of Egypt
Muslim conquest of the Maghreb
Umayyad conquest of Hispania
Muslim conquest of Sicily

See also 

 Spread of Islam
 Arab–Byzantine wars
 List of Ottoman conquests, sieges and landings